Berthier-sur-Mer is a town in the Montmagny Regional County Municipality within the Chaudière-Appalaches region of Quebec, Canada. It is located on the south shore of the Saint Lawrence River, east of Quebec City on Route 132.

History
Berthier-sur-Mer was named after Alexandre Berthier, a captain in the Carignan-Salières Regiment, who was given title to this area in 1672, then known as the seigneury of Berthier-en-bas.

During the 19th century, Irish immigrants were quarantined at nearby Grosse Isle, now a National Historic site.

Demographics

Population

Geology
A strip of rather interesting underlying sedimentary bedrock maintains a relatively straight shoreline through which a natural harbour, quite round in shape, has been eroded. The bedrock is set at about a 60 to 80° angle and is composed of hundreds of very thin layers of red shale interspersed every meter or so with 5 to 10 cm layers of what appears to be limestone. It is quite dramatic in places where it hasn't been worn down by human activities.

See also
 List of municipalities in Quebec

References

Municipalities in Quebec
Incorporated places in Chaudière-Appalaches